Lerheim is a Norwegian surname. Notable people with the surname include:

Asbjørn Lerheim (born 1977), Norwegian jazz guitarist and music educator
Magne Lerheim (1929–1994), Norwegian politician

Norwegian-language surnames